Alfred Bock (14 October 1859, Giessen, Germany – 6 March 1932, Giessen) was a German writer.  In 1924, Bock was awarded the prestigious Georg Büchner Prize, the most important literary prize for German language literature.

Bock was educated at the University of Giessen.  Deutsche Biographie described Bock's style as "the art of a strong and comfortable bourgeoisie who takes people as forces of nature and the world without coloured glass."

Notes 

1859 births
1932 deaths
People from Giessen
19th-century German male writers
19th-century German writers
20th-century German male writers
German male novelists